Laze is a village south of Logatec in the Inner Carniola region of Slovenia.

Unmarked grave
Laze is the site of an unmarked grave from the period after the Second World War. It contained the remains of a Slovene civilian victim of the December 1945 postwar killings. The remains were removed from the grave under unknown circumstances.

References

External links

Laze on Geopedia

Populated places in the Municipality of Logatec